David Mainse (August 13, 1936 – September 25, 2017) was a Canadian televangelist, broadcast executive and producer, and an evangelical Christian leader. He was the founder of Crossroads Christian Communications and host of the long-running Christian talk show 100 Huntley Street.

Early life
Mainse was born on August 13, 1936 in Campbell's Bay, Quebec. He was raised in a rural area near Ottawa, Ontario, then continued his education at Sudbury Secondary in Sudbury. Mainse was highly influenced by his father, Roy Lake Mainse (1896–1972), who worked as a missionary in Egypt, and then as a Holiness Movement Church pastor in Ontario and Quebec.

Mainse determined to go into ministry while still a teenager. He studied theology at Eastern Pentecostal Bible College (now Master's College and Seminary) in Peterborough, Ontario and was ordained. He pastored Pentecostal Assemblies of Canada churches in Brighton, Deep River and Hamilton. He met and married Norma-Jean Rutledge in 1958.

Television career
He began his communications ministry in 1962 with a 15-minute program following the late night news on affiliate CHOV in Pembroke, Ontario, while he pastored in Deep River. He later began a television program called Crossroads. The program gradually expanded to stations across Canada, but with minimal penetration into the American heartland.

In 1975, Mainse left the pastorate to focus full-time on television and evangelism projects. He began the ministry known as Crossroads Christian Communications in the early seventies with Circle Square, a children's telecast that has been carried in over 50 countries and continues to be shown in some.  Mainse later made the fictional ranch a reality as the summer camp, Circle Square Ranch. At its peak there were 11 Circle Square Ranches across Canada.

In 1976, Mainse began a project to telecast daily. He took the initiative and obtained a $100,000 a year, 20-year lease on a building at 100 Huntley Street in downtown Toronto that was suitable for conversion into a television studio. The lead program of this new production company took the studio's address as its name.  On June 15, 1977, the interview/talk show 100 Huntley Street (based on The 700 Club in the United States) was launched. This TV program featured more than 14,000 guests such as Billy Graham and Charlton Heston, and in 2015 was reported as one of three Canadian TV programs attracting over one million viewers each week. Crossroads produced a short-lived program for teenagers, Inside Track, in 1978.

In 1979, outside the Toronto mayor's office, Mainse protested the gay publication The Body Politic, saying that "parents and all decent people are particularly disgusted by the perversity, which publishes and disseminates anti-child, anti-parent dehumanizing materials." During the rally, Mainse was filmed protesting alongside Ken Campbell.

In 1998, the Canadian Radio-television and Telecommunications Commission granted Crossroads a licence to operate a 24-hour commercial TV station on cable, based in Burlington, Ontario and covering North America on satellite. CITS-TV has been broadcasting since September 1998. The station has been branded as YesTV since 2014.

Mainse served for several years at the request of mutual funds billionaire John Templeton as a judge in the awarding of the Templeton Prize. He received numerous awards for excellence in television production from the US-based National Religious Broadcasters, and several honorary doctorates, the most recent being from Tyndale University College and Seminary in Toronto in 2003.

Mainse stepped down as president of Crossroads and host of 100 Huntley Street in the summer of 2003. He passed the torch to his youngest son, Ron Mainse of Burlington, Ontario. He remained on the CTS board. Crossroads' current CEO is Kevin Shepherd and 100 Huntley Street is hosted by Greg Musselman, Cheryl Weber, Mark Masri and Lara Watson.

Though retired, he continued to be featured on 100 Huntley Street through various segments acting as a spokesman for Crossroads on various issues of social concern. Mainse has published a book, SALT.

In 2009, Mainse returned to host 100 Huntley Street while his sons Ron and Reynold stepped down from the ministry while under investigation concerning an alleged Ponzi scheme.

In January 2010, he launched new television programs, Really Good Medicine and A Living Witness to Amazing Grace. That year he undertook a tour of 150 Canadian cities, "Thank You Canada", celebrating his 50th year of television ministry.

In June 2012, the same month as Crossroads' 50th anniversary, Mainse was presented the Queen Elizabeth II Diamond Jubilee Medal at a gala event at Roy Thomson Hall. In May 2015 he received a Lifetime Global Impact award from Empowered21, for making "a significant impact on the world through the power of the Holy Spirit".

Also in 2012, he launched the 100 Words Daily Devotional Blog that in 2016 expanded into a two-minute segment throughout the day on YesTV.

Mainse died on September 25, 2017 from complications from MDS leukemia.

References

External links
Biography from 100 Huntley Street
DavidMainse.com
Biography from crossroads.ca

1936 births
2017 deaths
Canadian clergy
Canadian Pentecostals
Canadian television evangelists
People from Outaouais